Jiang Linhe (b. December 1947) is a Chinese painter, famous for depictions of nature.

Jiang Linhe is also a member of the Chinese Peasants' and Workers' Democratic Party, and is a congressman at the Seventh and Eighth National People's Congress.

Life
Jiang was born in Shexian, Anhui province. Jiang claims to have had no formal training in art, but learned to paint by watching customers of the Shexian Ink Stone Company and later at the Shexian Ink Company, where he worked in his youth.

Growing up near Mt. Huangshan, the landscape inspired many of his works; a 2015 exhibition in Shanghai consists of forty prints of  scenes around the mountain. He is also known for bird-and-flower paintings, particularly paintings of peonies, which caused one critic to call him "The Peony King."

He has had solo exhibitions hosted at the National Art Museum of China, as well as smaller art museums across China, such as Nanjing, Hangzhou, Hefei, and Zhuhai. His destinations abroad to present lectures or exhibitions include Japan, Singapore, and the United States. His works are included in the collections of the Zhongnanhai, the Great Hall of the People, and Beijing Rong Bao Zhai in China, as well as the Helen Foster Snow collection at Brigham Young University. He has published three volumes of collected paintings, entitled Jiang Linhe Huaji (姜林和画集).

Jiang Linhe is a member of Chinese Artists Association and the honorary chairman of Huangshan City Artists Association (黄山市中国画研究院院). In 2002, he became president of the newly founded Chinese Painting Research Institute of Huangshan (黄山市中国画研究院).

Further reading
Yuan Zhishang and Zhang Yunzhi. Jiang Linhe, Master of Hui Ink Stick Painting. Hefei: Anhui mei shu chu ban she, 1994.
Hu Lizhi 胡立之. "为黄山铸魂 替牡丹传神——姜林和的绘画艺术." Wenhua Shikong《文化时空》, 2003年第12期

References

External links 

Page at artxun.com

Painters from Anhui
1942 births
Living people